P. adspersus may refer to:

Palaemon adspersus, the Baltic prawn, a shrimp species
Paralichthys adspersus, the fine flounder, a flatfish species
Pseudophilautus adspersus, a frog species
Pternistis adspersus, the red-billed spurfowl, a bird species
Pyxicephalus adspersus, the African bullfrog, a frog species